Group E of the 2014–15 EuroChallenge consisted of Joensuun Kataja, Belfius Mons-Hainaut, JSF Nanterre and Benfica. Play began on 4 November and ended on 16 December 2014.

Teams

Standings

References

Group E
2014–15 in French basketball
2014–15 in Belgian basketball
2014–15 in Portuguese basketball
2014–15 in Finnish basketball